Concho is an unincorporated community in Canadian County, Oklahoma, United States. It is north of the Concho Indian Boarding School. The post office opened April 20, 1915. The ZIP code is 73022. The school and post office were named for Indian agent, Charles E. Shell. It is the headquarters of the Cheyenne and Arapaho Tribes.

References

Unincorporated communities in Canadian County, Oklahoma
Unincorporated communities in Oklahoma